Estradiol propionate (EP), also known as estradiol monopropionate or estradiol 17β-propionate and sold under the brand names Acrofollin, Akrofollin, and Follhormon, is an estrogen medication and estrogen ester which is no longer marketed. It is the C17β propionate ester of estradiol. EP was provided in an oil solution and was administered by intramuscular injection. The medication was first marketed by 1938 or 1939.

See also 
 Estradiol dipropionate
 Estradiol 3-propionate
 List of estrogen esters § Estradiol esters

References 

Abandoned drugs
Estradiol esters
Propionate esters